Hillwort may refer to:

 Wild thyme
 Mentha pulegium